Katarina Pandza (born 17 April 2002) is an Austrian handballer for TuS Metzingen and the Austrian national team.

She represented Austria at the 2021 World Women's Handball Championship, placing 16th.

References

2002 births
Living people
Austrian female handball players
People from Mödling
Sportspeople from Lower Austria